KPIH may refer to:

 Pocatello Regional Airport (ICAO code KPIH)
 KPIH-LP, a low-power radio station (98.9 FM) licensed to serve Payson, Arizona, United States